Is There Anybody Out There may refer to:

Is There Anybody Out There?, a song from the Pink Floyd album, The Wall.
Is There Anybody Out There? The Wall Live 1980–81, 2000 live album by Pink Floyd
Is There Anybody Out There?, a song by Beyond the Black
Is There Anybody Out There? (album), 2014 debut album by A Great Big World
"Is There Anybody Out There" (Nicki French song), 1995
"Is There Anybody Out There?", a song on the Roger Daltrey album Parting Should Be Painless
"Is There Anybody Out There?", a stand-alone single by American band Machine Head

See also

Is There Anybody There? (film), 1976 Australian TV movie directed by Peter Maxwell
Is Anybody Out There? (song), song by K'naan featuring singer-songwriter Nelly Furtado
"Is Anybody Out There?" (Fear the Walking Dead), a 2019 episode of the TV series Fear the Walking Dead
Is Anybody There?, a 2008 British film
Anybody Out There?, a 2007 novel by Marian Keyes
Anybody Out There, a 2010 album by Rufio